Infrastructure debt is the fixed income component of infrastructure assets. It provides yield enhancements, especially those dealing with capital preservation.

It is a complex investment category reserved for sophisticated institutional investors who can gauge jurisdiction-specific risk parameters, assess a project's long-term viability, understand transaction risks, conduct due diligence, negotiate (multi) creditors’ agreements, make timely decisions on consents and waivers, and analyze loan performance over time..

Characteristics of Infrastructure Debt
Infrastructure debt, in comparison to infrastructure equity, has many distinct characteristics. Infrastructure debt is a short-term investment that has lower returns. It is much less risky and it does not generally benefit from the same inflation. This results from the majority of companies use floating rate debt or inflation linked-bonds. When dealing with floating rate debt, interest payments and bank bills move in unison. This is, a rise in inflation causes a rise in bank bill rates. Inflation-linked bonds occur when interest and principal payments are linked to CPI. Infrastructure debt has many defining characteristics that separate it from other infrastructure assets.

Infrastructure Debt Expanding
Research conducted by the World Pensions Council (WPC) suggests that most UK and European pension funds wishing to gain a degree of exposure to infrastructure debt have done so indirectly, through investments made in infrastructure funds managed by specialized UK, Canadian, US and Australian funds. Sequoia Investment Management Company, based in London, has launched Sequoia Economic Infrastructure Income Fund targeted at fund managers and institutional investors.

On 29 November 2011, the British government unveiled an unprecedented plan to encourage large-scale pension investments in new roads, hospitals, airports... etc. across the UK. The plan is aimed at enticing 20 billion pounds ($30.97 billion) of investment in domestic infrastructure projects "over the next decade", which could mark the beginning of a new wave of pension fund investment in infrastructure in the UK.

Key Outcomes Met by Infrastructure Debt
Ratings agencies increasingly recognize the attractive credit characteristics of infrastructure debt including lower ratings volatility, lower defaults and higher recoveries than equivalently rated non-financial corporate debt.

The rising popularity of Infrastructure Debt relates to the key outcomes it provides for its investors. These outcomes include low historical losses, portfolio diversity, returns in excess of more liquid bonds and provides certainty of cashflow.

Investing in Infrastructure debt has overall caused low historical losses when compared to other investing options. The wide range of choice into where your money gets invested allows for the investor to create a well rounded investing portfolio.

References

External links
International Debt Collection

Debt
Infrastructure investment
Economic development